An ice carousel is a circular piece of ice made to spin like a carousel within a larger body of water, often a frozen lake. It is a man-made phenomenon, made by cutting the floating ice sheet, unlike the natural rotating ice circles.

History
In 2017, Janne Käpylehto carved one in Lohja, in Finland. 

Two men created one in Burntside Lake, near Ely, Minnesota, in 2018.

An ice carousel created in Little Falls, Minnesota in early 2019 was dubbed the largest in the world.

The feat was recognized by the World Ice Carousel Association, which keeps track of records.

An even larger ice carousel was cut into Lake Lappajärvi in Finland by Janne Käpylehto's team in March 2021. The team included the mayors of the three towns surrounding the crater lake.

In April 2021, Volunteers in Saint Agatha, Maine, United States of America created an even larger ice carousel totaling 1,234 feet in diameter. Roger Morneault and the Northern Maine Ice Busters used a trencher, long-bar chainsaws and six power augers to get the job done, according to Mike Cyr who was involved in the project.

References

Buildings and structures made of snow or ice
Carousels